In basketball, an assist is a pass to a teammate that directly leads to a score by field goal. The Dutch Basketball League's (DBL) assist title is awarded to the player with the highest assists per game average in a given regular season. The assists title was first recognized in the 1985–1986 season when statistics on assists were first compiled.

Leaders

Notes

References

assists